Norman Selwyn 'Sel' Murray (23 November 1917 – 29 May 1992) was an Australian rules footballer who played with the North Melbourne Football Club in the Victorian Football League (VFL) from 1937 to 1944 and then for the Richmond Football Club in 1945 and 1946.

Mainly used as a full forward, he played the 1947 season for North Melbourne seconds, leading the competition goalkicking with 123 for the season and playing in the seconds' premiership side. He ended his career back in the North Melbourne senior side for much of the 1948 season. His 88 goals in 1941 was the most in the League and he took just 73 games to reach 300 career goals which is equal third fastest of all time.

Murray also served in the Australian Army for two months in 1940 during World War II.

References

 Hogan P: The Tigers Of Old, Richmond FC, Melbourne 1996

External links

1917 births
Australian rules footballers from Melbourne
North Melbourne Football Club players
Richmond Football Club players
1992 deaths
VFL Leading Goalkicker Medal winners
People from Carlton, Victoria
Australian Army personnel of World War II
Military personnel from Melbourne